Parornix petiolella is a moth of the family Gracillariidae. It is known from Austria, Bulgaria, the Czech Republic, France, Germany, Hungary, Italy, Kazakhstan, Luxembourg, Moldova, Poland, Romania, the European part of Russia, Slovakia, Switzerland and Ukraine.

The larvae feed on Armeniaca, Malus species (including Malus domestica, Malus pumila and Malus sylvestris), Prunus species (including Prunus cerasifera, Prunus cerasus, Prunus domestica, Prunus spinosa and Prunus vulgaris), Persica and Pyrus species.

References

Parornix
Moths of Europe
Moths of Asia
Moths described in 1863